Talkin' Trash may refer to:

List of The Fairly OddParents episodes
Godzilla: The Series
"Talkin' Trash", song by	Betty Davis	1976
"Talkin' Trash", song by	The Marathons	1961